KMGW may refer to:

KMGW (FM), a radio station (99.3 FM) licensed to serve Naches, Washington, United States
KRNK, a radio station in Casper, Wyoming, United States known as KMGW from 2001 to 2009
KMLD, a radio station in Casper, Wyoming, known as KMGW from 1989 to 2001
KQQL, a radio station in Anoka, Minnesota, United States known as KMGW from 1984 to 1986
The ICAO airport code for Morgantown Municipal Airport in Morgantown, West Virginia, United States